During World War II, the United States Army Air Forces (USAAF) established numerous airfields in Montana for training pilots and aircrews of USAAF fighters and bombers.

Most of these airfields were under the command of Second Air Force or the Army Air Forces Training Command (AAFTC) (A predecessor of the current-day United States Air Force Air Education and Training Command). However, the other USAAF support commands (Air Technical Service Command (ATSC); Air Transport Command (ATC) or Troop Carrier Command) commanded a significant number of airfields in support roles.

It is still possible to find remnants of these wartime airfields. Many were converted into municipal airports, returned to agriculture, or retained as United States Air Force installations that served as front-line bases during the Cold War. Hundreds of the temporary buildings that were used survive today, and are being used for other purposes.

Major Airfields 
Second Air Force
 Cut Bank Army Airfield, Cut Bank
 II Fighter Command
 Now: Cut Bank Municipal Airport 
 Glasgow Army Airfield, Glasgow
 II Fighter Command
 Now: Glasgow International Airport 
 Note: Glasgow Air Force Base (1957-1976) is NOT the World War II Airfield.
 Great Falls Army Airfield, Great Falls
 352d Army Air Force Base Unit
 Was: Great Falls Air Force Base (1947-1955)
 Now:  Malmstrom Air Force Base (1955-Present; runway inactive since 1997, limited to rotary-wing ops)
 Lewistown Army Airfield, Lewistown
 II Bomber Command
 Now: Lewistown Municipal Airport 

Air Transport Command
 Gore Army Airfield, Great Falls
 Joint use USAAF/Civil Airport
 7th Ferrying Group
 385th Army Air Force Base Unit
 Now: Great Falls International Airport 
 And:  Great Falls Air National Guard Base
 Helena Army Airfield, Helena
 Joint use USAAF/Civil Airport
 Now: Helena Regional Airport

References
 Maurer, Maurer (1983). Air Force Combat Units Of World War II. Maxwell AFB, Alabama: Office of Air Force History. .
 Ravenstein, Charles A. (1984). Air Force Combat Wings Lineage and Honors Histories 1947-1977. Maxwell AFB, Alabama: Office of Air Force History. .
 Thole, Lou (1999), Forgotten Fields of America : World War II Bases and Training, Then and Now - Vol. 2. Pictorial Histories Pub . 
 Military Airfields in World War II - Montana

External links

 01
World War II
Airfields of the United States Army Air Forces in the United States by state
United States World War II army airfields